Antrift (in its lower course: Antreff) is a river of Hesse, Germany. It flows into the Schwalm in Zella.

See also
List of rivers of Hesse

References

Rivers of Hesse
Rivers of the Vogelsberg
Rivers of Germany